WZNP is an American non-commercial FM radio station located in Newark, Ohio, and operates on the assigned frequency of 89.3 MHz.

The station was established as the replacement for South Zanesville-licensed station WCVZ, which was sold by the Christian Voice of Central Ohio in 2008 to become the new home for WHIZ-FM. WZNP is part of the "River Radio Network", along with WFCO and WZCP.

External links
WZNP website

ZNP
Licking County, Ohio
Radio stations established in 2008
2008 establishments in Ohio